Husky Haven Airport  is a small airport located in Montrose, Pennsylvania. The airport serves Susquehanna County, Pennsylvania as a general aviation airport. The airport was commissioned in July 1969.

References

External links
 Husky Haven Airport - Aircraft Owners and Pilots Association

Defunct airports in Pennsylvania
Airports in Pennsylvania
Transportation buildings and structures in Susquehanna County, Pennsylvania